Yvonne Kenny AM (born 25 November 1950) is an Australian soprano, particularly associated with Handel, Mozart and bel canto roles.

Biography 
Born in Sydney, Kenny first studied at the University of Sydney in science, hoping to become a biochemist, but decided to pursue a career in music instead. She studied first with Myra Lambert at the Sydney Conservatorium of Music, and later won a scholarship to study at the opera school at La Scala in Milan. After a year of studying there, she went to England, where after a few recitals and TV appearances, her breakthrough came on 11 October 1975, when she replaced, with only four days' notice, the soprano scheduled to sing in an Opera Rara concert performance of Donizetti's Rosmonda d'Inghilterra at the Queen Elizabeth Hall. It was a triumph and the virtually unknown Kenny became an overnight star.

She made her debut at the Royal Opera House the following year, in the premiere of Hans Werner Henze's We Come to the River, later singing in Handel operas such as Semele, Alcina, Giulio Cesare, and such Mozart operas as: Idomeneo, Mitridate, re di Ponto, La clemenza di Tito, The Abduction from the Seraglio, The Magic Flute. She also sang Sophie in both Werther and Der Rosenkavalier. She was also a regular guest at the Glyndebourne Festival and the English National Opera. On the international scene, she appeared at opera houses in Zurich, Munich, Vienna, Aix-en-Provence, Washington, etc. She often returned home, appearing at the Sydney Opera House in roles including: Mélisande, Manon, Leila, Micaela, Fiordiligi, Pamina, Alcina and Cleopatra. Later she sang the roles of Richard Strauss.

She performed the Olympic Hymn at the closing ceremony of the 2000 Summer Olympics in Sydney. In 2001 she was awarded the Centenary Medal.

In 2009, Kenny appeared as Blanche DuBois in the Australian premiere of Previn's A Streetcar Named Desire for Opera Australia. After her initial success with Opera Rara, she appeared in many recordings with them, notably Donizetti's Ugo, conte di Parigi and Emilia di Liverpool, Meyerbeer's Il crociato in Egitto, and Simon Mayr's Medea in Corinto. She also provided the voice for the title role in the TV mini-series Melba, about Dame Nellie Melba.

She is the Chairman and Life President of the Australian Music Foundation.

Discography

Albums

Honours
 Kenny was made a Member of the Order of Australia (AM) in the 1989 Queen's Birthday Honour List for "services to opera".

Awards and nominations
 In June 1999 Kenny was awarded an honorary Doctorate of Music by the University of Sydney.
 In January 2019 she won "the 2019 Australian of the Year in the UK Award" – the top honour from the Australia Day Foundation.

ARIA Music Awards
The ARIA Music Awards is an annual awards ceremony that recognises excellence, innovation, and achievement across all genres of Australian music. 

|-
| 1995
| Simple Gifts 
| ARIA Award for Best Classical Album
| 
|-
| 1998
| Handel: Arias 
| ARIA Award for Best Classical Album
| 
|-
| 2022
| Gorecki: Symphony No. 3 
| ARIA Award for Best Classical Album
| 
|-
| 2022
| Make Believe
| ARIA Award for Best Classical Album
| 
|-
| 2022
| Ross Edwards: Frog and Star Cycle / Symphonies 2 & 3 
| ARIA Award for Best Classical Album
| 
|-

Bernard Heinze Memorial Award
The Sir Bernard Heinze Memorial Award is given to a person who has made an outstanding contribution to music in Australia.

|-
| 1994 || Yvonne Kenny|| Sir Bernard Heinze Memorial Award ||  || 
|-

Mo Awards
The Australian Entertainment Mo Awards (commonly known informally as the Mo Awards), were annual Australian entertainment industry awards. They recognise achievements in live entertainment in Australia from 1975 to 2016. Yvonne Kenny won one award in that time.
 (wins only)
|-
| 1994
| Yvonne Kenny 
| Operatic Performer of the Year 
| 
|-

References

Sources
 Grove Music Online, Elizabeth Forbes, March 2008.

External links 
  ( requires Adobe Flash)  

1950 births
ARIA Award winners
Australian operatic sopranos
Sydney Conservatorium of Music alumni
Living people
University of Sydney alumni
Members of the Order of Australia
Recipients of the Centenary Medal